Cassio Rivetti (Kassio Rivetti; born 20 February 1980) is a Ukrainian-Brazilian Olympic show jumping rider. Representing Ukraine since 2009, he competed at two Summer Olympics (in 2012 and 2016). His best Olympic result is 12th place in the individual jumping from 2012.

Rivetti participated at three World Equestrian Games (in 2006, 2010 and 2014) and at two European Show Jumping Championships (in 2009 and 2015). He finished 8th individually at the 2014 World Games, while his best team performance is also 8th place from 2015 European Championships.

References

External links
 

1980 births
Living people
Sportspeople from São Paulo
Brazilian male equestrians
Ukrainian male equestrians
Show jumping riders
Olympic equestrians of Ukraine
Equestrians at the 2012 Summer Olympics
Equestrians at the 2016 Summer Olympics
Ukrainian people of Brazilian descent
Brazilian emigrants to Ukraine
Naturalized citizens of Ukraine